Frédéric Garny (born August 13, 1974 in Mulhouse) is a French former professional footballer who played as a right-winger.

Transfer history

External links
Frédéric Garny profile  

1974 births
Living people
Footballers from Mulhouse
French footballers
Association football midfielders
FC Mulhouse players
FC Sochaux-Montbéliard players
Montpellier HSC players
Chamois Niortais F.C. players
ES Troyes AC players
Angers SCO players
FC Sète 34 players
Ligue 1 players
Ligue 2 players